Zarband is a village in Kezab Rural District, Khezrabad District, Saduq County, Yazd Province, Iran. At the 2006 census, its population was 90, in 27 families.

References 

Populated places in Saduq County